Fred Otis Ekstrand (March 9, 1899 – July 8, 1972) was an American football player and coach. He served as the head football coach at Iowa Wesleyan College in Mount Pleasant, Iowa from 1953 to 1955, where he led the school to an undefeated season in 1953. Ekstrand was born on March 9, 1899, in Yates City, Illinois. He graduated from Yates City High School there in 1919 and from Iowa Wesleyan College in 1925. Ekstrand was struck by a car and killed while he was crossing a street on July 8, 1972, in Eugene, Oregon, where he was attending the U.S. Olympics track and field trials.

Head coaching record

References

External links
 

1899 births
1972 deaths
Iowa Wesleyan Tigers football coaches
Iowa Wesleyan University alumni
People from Knox County, Illinois
Road incident deaths in Oregon